Emerald Hill may refer to:

Emerald Hill, Victoria or South Melbourne, a suburb of Melbourne, Victoria, Australia
Emerald Hill, New Zealand, a suburb of Upper Hutt, New Zealand
Emerald Hill, Singapore
Emerald Hill, Zimbabwe, a suburb in Harare, Zimbabwe
Emerald Hill School, Zimbabwe, a school for deaf children in Harare, Zimbabwe
Emerald Hill Children's Home, Zimbabwe, an orphanage in Harare, Zimbabwe
Emerald Hill (Clarksville, Tennessee), a mansion listed on the US National Register of Historic Places
Emerald Hills, San Diego, California, U.S.
Emerald Hill Zone (Sonic the Hedgehog), a level in Sonic the Hedgehog 2